League of Nations Trust Territory of the Pacific Islands were the League of Nations Mandate consisting of several groups of islands in the Pacific Ocean which came under the administration of Australia, British Empire, Japanese Empire and New Zealand after the defeat of the German Empire in World War I.

See also
Territory of New Guinea
South Pacific Mandate
North Solomon Islands
German New Guinea

History of Papua New Guinea
League of Nations mandates